Liar Game (stylized as LIAR GAME) is a Japanese manga series written and illustrated by Shinobu Kaitani. It was serialized in Shueisha's seinen manga magazine Weekly Young Jump from February 2005 to January 2015. It was adapted into a Japanese television series in 2007, with a second season which ran from 2009 to 2010. It was also adapted into two live action films; Liar Game: The Final Stage in 2010 and Liar Game: Reborn in 2012. A South Korean television series adaptation aired in 2014.

Plot summary
An uncommonly naive college student named Nao Kanzaki receives a package containing 100 million yen (about US$1 million) and a note that she is now a contestant in the Liar Game Tournament. In this fictional tournament, contestants are encouraged to cheat and lie to obtain other contestants' money, with the losers forced to bear a debt proportional to their losses. When Nao's first opponent, a trusted former teacher, steals her money, she seeks assistance from a con man named Shinichi Akiyama. Though they manage to defeat him, Nao and Akiyama decide to buy out his debt and advance through different rounds of the Liar Game Tournament against merciless contestants, while at the same time attempting to free their opponents from debt and defeat the Liar Game organization from within.

Characters

Protagonists

Nao Kanzaki is a "foolishly honest" college student who is coerced into playing the Liar Game. She is extremely honest and initially naïve, but these attributes allow her to win the trust of fellow contestants in the Liar Game. Nao firmly believes that all people have value and, though not very bright, makes unique observations due to her naïvety and emotional sensitivity, which the others in the game notably lack, for better or for worse. She gradually learns to question others while maintaining the ability to trust her allies. Although Nao has had several opportunities to leave the Liar Game, she continues to play, wishing to save the other players who have fallen into debt. Nao's only known family member is her father, who is hospitalized with terminal cancer. She has no close friends other than Akiyama, who saves her from her self-described lonely life. In turn, she develops an exceptionally strong attachment to Akiyama.

Akiyama is a graduate of Teito University with a degree in criminal psychology. He became a con man in order to take down the multi-level marketing corporation that swindled his mother to the point where she committed suicide to save Akiyama from debt via her life insurance. After being released from prison, Akiyama reluctantly agrees to help Nao win the Liar Game after she despairingly cries out, "Save me!" Mitsuo Tanimura later suggests that Akiyama consented to help Nao because he saw a resemblance between Nao's and his mother's situations. Akiyama enters the Liar Game in Round 2 by substituting for another player, and by Round 3 is seen as an unofficial leader among the Liar Game's contestants. Akiyama utilizes Nao's ability to make sincere, emotional appeals to sway other contestants, making her Akiyama's most powerful weapon. Nevertheless, he continually tries to pay off her debt to get her to leave the Liar Game and never lets her come into harm's way. Akiyama's motivation for continuing in the Liar Game is to find the real motives behind the Liar Game Tournament organization and bring it down.

Antagonists

Nao's former teacher and first opponent whom she faces, Fujisawa was originally a kind man, concerned about the welfare of his students. However, after a series of misfortunes, Fujisawa has become angry, hateful, and untrusting. Nao is shocked when he outright told her that he does not care if she goes into debt or is forced into prostitution to pay it back. Fujisawa's behavior, however, only solidifies Akiyama's decision to help Nao. At the end of the first round after Akiyama outsmarts him, Nao gives Fujisawa her winnings so he can repay his debt. Fujisawa is last seen bowing to her in gratitude.

A trans woman who first appears in Round 2, as a woman named "Hitomi". Possibly an in-transition or post-op transsexual, she still has breasts when not dressed in female clothes. Sly, calculating, and a 5th degree black belt, Fukunaga is a skilled manipulator whose weaknesses appear to be her desire for money and her temper. She's apparently much older than she appears. During Round 3, Fukunaga learns to cooperate with Nao and Akiyama, and even when Fukunaga finishes the round debt-free, she chooses to continue in the tournament to aid them. However, Fukunaga is forced to confront Yokoya without their help in the third revival round and is eliminated from the game with over one billion yen of debt. In later chapters, Fukunaga recognizes Nao's improvement and starts to grow fond of her, although she still believes she is incompetent. Nao also observed that Fukunaga may have a crush on Akiyama. After Fukunaga's identified-as-male-at-birth identity is revealed, the Japanese text deliberately avoids referring to "her" by gender. (In the live version, this character is still male, but with a vaguely homosexual overtone). Alternates between personas - an ultra-feminine, cold, and mature femme fatale; a bullheaded, boisterous, and physically intimidating man in obvious drag; a loud, seemingly none-too-bright young delinquent girl; and gradations in between - whichever currently best suits Fukunaga's own needs, both in-game and outside of it. She is absolutely convincing as a female when she so desires and regularly has everyone fooled. Also stated to have managed to play a convincing non-descript male to orchestrate a con (not shown), despite having prominent real cleavage, said to be the result of a combination of female hormone injections and breast augmentation surgery with saline implants.

A character obsessed with domination, Yokoya first appears in Round 3. He is a calm, eerie, dark-haired young man who's often shown carrying white mice in his pockets and dresses in vaguely militaristic suits, admiring and seeking to emulate notorious 20th-century dictators; most notably Adolf Hitler. Nearco describes Yokoya as Akiyama's greatest rival, and Nao sensed something odd about him early in the game. Yokoya comes from a wealthy family and his strategy frequently involves bribing other contestants into becoming his pawns. His team is depicted as Yokoya's complete dictatorship, as opposed to Nao's cooperative team. Although Yokoya initially planned to drop out of the Liar Game with his Round 3 winnings, Nao taunts him into proceeding to the next round, and Yokoya swore to bring down Nao and Akiyama in revenge. After losing Round 4 to them, Yokoya decides to keep playing to the end, aiming to become the ultimate winner of the Liar Game. During the Third Revival Round, Yokoya was able to accurately predict the name of the game to be played by the contestants; this is not even told to the hosts and other LGT Office Employees. Yokoya claims to have deduced the it because he has determined the true meaning of the Liar Game, but he actually had read a foreign book from which the Liar Game was inspired, including the games played on it by order. After being outsmarted by Akiyama in the final game, Yokoya finally admits defeat, claiming that (unlike his idol Hitler) he must know when to quit; much to the happiness of his father, who's also revealed to be one of the hosts of the Liar Game. It is later revealed that his father taught him to manipulate people in order to groom him as a successor.

Harimoto wears long robes and a straw hat. He has deep wrinkles, which hints that he may be the oldest character introduced so far. Unlike Akiyama and Yokoya, both of whom excel at psychological and mental manipulation, Harimoto's strength lies in taking advantage of a person's emotional state. He first appears in Round 4, as the founder of the Peaceful Heaven (also: Peaceful Paradise) cult. Three female members of his cult - Mika Mikamoto, Kei Kimura, and Yukiko Abe - are also contestants in the Liar Game and follow him unconditionally, giving him a strong advantage. He controls his cult members by telling them that all mankind descends from humans and demons as well, claiming that his mission is to gather those like him with little demonic blood under his guidance, in a quest to restore a (nearly) pure human bloodline and work to overthrow the demons. It is later revealed that he used cold reading to rescue the three women when each was in her lowest emotional state, thus seducing them into joining his cult. Once defeated in Round 4, Harimoto and his cultists return for the subsequent Revival Round, and moved by Nao's incorruptible spirit, they withdraw from the Liar Game, giving away the money they had previously collected to pay other players' debt.

Liar Game Tournament (LGT) Office
The purpose of the LGT Office is revealed in the last chapter. At the head of the office are those who wished to recreate the conditions in a radical political work whose last volume was confiscated in order to surmise its contents, the other members with patterned masks had participated in an initial attempt to conduct a simulation of the radical work (i.e. a first Liar Game Tournament). They agreed to return to help in the second (successful) attempt at holding a Liar Game Tournament. This second tournament is what is described in the manga.

"Handlers" manage individual contestants and provide information on upcoming rounds, and "hosts" carry out the actual rounds of the Liar Game and observe the contestants.

The identities of some of the LGT Office members are revealed:

A man who posed as a lawyer (a policeman in the live-action) and whom Nao first consults when she gets involved in the Liar Game Tournament. It is not revealed until later that he is actually part of the Liar Game Tournament working to make sure players cannot escape the game by going to the authorities. Tanimura is the Liar Game representative assigned to Nao. It was Tanimura who initially gives Nao the idea of using a scam artist to win the game (in the live-action adaptation, this was deliberately done in order to bait Akiyama into participating in the game). He does not wear a mask.

One of the hosts of the Liar Game, he wears a suit and an ornate mask over his face. Although he admires Akiyama and Fukunaga for their intelligence, he admits to being most interested in how Nao participates in the games. He is apparently one of the smartest and cleverest among the hosts. He admits near the end of the manga that he understands the way Akiyama thinks well, a subtle indication that Leronira held the same role as Akiyama during the first Liar Game. Early in the game, he correctly predicts that Nao would be the one to change the dynamic of the game. In the live-action adaptation, he is the masked figure who gives players instructions via recorded videos or through a monitor.

A co-host of the Liar Game who wears a mask with a long moustache. First appearing in Round 3, Nearco admires Yokoya, describing him as a fearsome individual, and cannot understand Leronira's confidence in Nao as a player. Nearco is analytical and intelligent, although not up to the standard of Leronira or Rabelais. These qualities suggest that he may have held Fukunaga's role in the first Liar Game Tournament.

A third host of the Liar Game, Solario wears a mask with a sun drawn on the right eye. Solario is impressed that Nao is able to realize the objective of Second Revival Round before any of the other players.

A fourth host of the Liar Game who appears similar to the other round dealers, but with a suit and bowtie. His clothes are a bit scraggly-looking, his hair stands out, and his mask resembles the face-paint of a clown in the Renaissance with long, oval markings on each of where his eyes and mouth should be. He hosts the Round 4 Qualifier for Akiyama and Nao's side, rooting for them and tending to fall completely for all of Akiyama's plans, even though he's not involved and knows all the rules of the game. Forli is the least intelligent of the LGT Officers.

A family agent assigned to monitor Yokoya to ensure his safety. She wears sunglasses and a surgical mask across her mouth and nose, effectively concealing her face. Kurifuji is able to comprehend and predict Yokoya's plans and schemes more accurately than the other members of the LGT Office. She majored in psychology.

A fifth host of the Liar Game, who hosts Round 4 and its qualifier on Fukunaga's side. His mask has a yin-yang symbol on the forehead; ☵ (water) i-ching symbol on the left cheek of mask; and ☲ (fire) i-ching symbol on the right cheek in a manner somewhat reminiscent of the South Korean flag.  In contrast to Leronira, he does not seem to consider Nao a serious threat in the Liar Game. He passionately declares that human beings are slaves to greed and unable to work together for the greater good only to be proven wrong by Nao and Akiyama's alliances.

A sixth host of the Liar Game who is the dealer for the Revival Round III for Group A.

A seventh host of the Liar Game who is the dealer for the Revival Round III for Group B. He is Yokoya's father. He is rich and famous; in the previous Liar Game, he won in almost all the games that were played, according to Leronira.

Called the "Chief Executive". He appears during Revival Round III.

Media

Manga

Liar Game, written and illustrated by Shinobu Kaitani, was serialized in Shueisha's Weekly Young Jump from February 17, 2005, to January 22, 2015. Shueisha collected its chapters in nineteen tankōbon volumes, released from September 16, 2005, to April 17, 2015.

A short story "Roots of A" has been published as the title piece of a Shinobu Kaitani's anthology released in July 2008.

Live-action
Liar Game was adapted into a Japanese television series: Liar Game, a 2007 Fuji series broadcast, followed in 2009 by Liar Game: Season 2. In 2010, the full-length film Liar Game: The Final Stage was released as a continuation of the TV series. A sequel, entitled Liar Game: Reborn, was released in 2012.

A 2014 Korean drama adaptation also titled Liar Game aired on cable channel tvN.

See also
 Gambling in Japan
 Squid Game, a 2021 South Korean television show influenced by Liar Game

References

External links
 

Liar Game
2005 manga
Fraud in fiction
Anime and manga about gambling
Manga adapted into films
Psychological thriller anime and manga
Seinen manga
Shueisha franchises
Shueisha manga